Kenwood is a neighborhood in Duluth, Minnesota, United States.

Kenwood Avenue and Arrowhead Road are two of the main routes in the community.

Notes
Businesses in Kenwood's small business district include a grocery store, an automotive service shop, restaurants, and several other local businesses.

Chester Creek flows through the Kenwood neighborhood.

City bus routes providing service to Kenwood include the following:
 #18 (UMD / CSS)
 #12 (Kenwood)
 #13 and 13U (UMD–Woodland)
 #11 and #11K (East 8th–UMD).

Adjacent neighborhoods

(Directions following those of Duluth's general street grid system, not actual geographical coordinates)

Chester Park, UMD, and Hunter's Park (east)
Duluth Heights (west)
East Hillside (south)
City of Rice Lake (north)

References

External links
City of Duluth website
City map of neighborhoods (PDF)

Duluth–Superior metropolitan area
Neighborhoods in Duluth, Minnesota